Afrid Max Ebong Ngome (born 26 August 1999) is a Belarusian professional footballer who plays as a midfielder for FC Astana.

Career

Club
On 24 January 2020, FC Astana announced the signing of Ebong to a four-year contract.

International
He made his first appearance for the national team on 9 September 2019, after coming on as a half-time substitute for Yury Kavalyow in the 0:1 loss against Wales in a friendly match.

Career statistics

Club

International

International goals
Scores and results list Belarus' goal tally first.

Honours
Shakhtyor Soligorsk
Belarusian Cup (1): 2018–19

Astana
Kazakhstan Premier League (1): 2022
Kazakhstan Super Cup (1): 2020

Personal life
His father is Cameroonian and his mother Belarusian. His parents met at the Vitebsk medical university where both were students. Ebong is reportedly estranged from his father.

References

External links 
 
 

1999 births
Living people
Belarusian people of Cameroonian descent
Sportspeople of Cameroonian descent
Sportspeople from Vitebsk
Belarusian footballers
Belarusian expatriate footballers
Expatriate footballers in Kazakhstan
Belarusian expatriate sportspeople in Kazakhstan
Association football midfielders
Belarus international footballers
FC Shakhtyor Soligorsk players
FC Astana players